The 2004 Pittsburgh Pirates season was the 123rd season of the franchise; the 118th in the National League. This was their fourth season at PNC Park. The Pirates finished fifth in the National League Central with a record of 72–89.

Offseason
October 2, 2003: Jeff D'Amico was released by the Pittsburgh Pirates.
February 19, 2004: Randall Simon was signed as a free agent with the Pittsburgh Pirates.
February 24, 2004: Raúl Mondesí signed as a free agent with the Pittsburgh Pirates.

Regular season

Season standings

Game log

|- style="background:#cfc;"
| 1 || April 5 || Phillies || 2–1 || Wells || Millwood || Mesa || 35,702 || 1–0
|- style="background:#fbb;"
| 2 || April 7 || Phillies || 4–5 || Cormier || Boehringer || Wagner || 15,126 || 1–1
|- style="background:#cfc;"
| 3 || April 8 || Phillies || 6–2 || Vogelsong || Padilla || Mesa || 9,689 || 2–1
|- style="background:#fbb;"
| 4 || April 9 || @ Reds || 1–5 || Harang || Fogg || — || 27,713 || 2–2
|- style="background:#fbb;"
| 5 || April 10 || @ Reds || 1–3 || Lidle || Wells || Graves || 23,449 || 2–3
|- style="background:#cfc;"
| 6 || April 11 || @ Reds || 4–3 || Perez || Haynes || Mesa || 16,925 || 3–3
|- style="background:#cfc;"
| 7 || April 12 || @ Cubs || 13–2 || Benson || Maddux || Meadows || 40,483 || 4–3
|- style="background:#fbb;"
| 8 || April 14 || @ Cubs || 3–8 || Clement || Vogelsong || — || 38,968 || 4–4
|- style="background:#fbb;"
| 9 || April 15 || @ Cubs || 5–10 || Zambrano || Fogg || — || 39,450 || 4–5
|- style="background:#cfc;"
| 10 || April 16 || @ Mets || 7–6 || Wells || Moreno || Mesa || 18,554 || 5–5
|- style="background:#cfc;"
| 11 || April 17 || @ Mets || 2–1 || Meadows || Trachsel || Mesa || 40,172 || 6–5
|- style="background:#cfc;"
| 12 || April 18 || @ Mets || 8–1 || Benson || Seo || — || 44,345 || 7–5
|- style="background:#fbb;"
| 13 || April 20 || Cubs || 1–9 || Zambrano || Vogelsong || — || 11,746 || 7–6
|- style="background:#fbb;"
| 14 || April 21 || Cubs || 1–12 || Mitre || Fogg || — || 9,933 || 7–7
|- style="background:#fbb;"
| 15 || April 23 || Reds || 4–6 || Wilson || Wells || Graves || 17,350 || 7–8
|- style="background:#fbb;"
| 16 || April 24 || Reds || 7–9 || Van Poppel || Benson || Graves || 24,732 || 7–9
|- style="background:#cfc;"
| 17 || April 25 || Reds || 6–0 || Perez || Acevedo || — || 13,264 || 8–9
|- style="background:#fbb;"
| 18 || April 26 || Reds || 2–5 || Harang || Vogelsong || Graves || 8,579 || 8–10
|- style="background:#cfc;"
| 19 || April 28 || Astros || 4–2 || Torres || Oswalt || Mesa || 9,813 || 9–10
|- style="background:#fbb;"
| 20 || April 29 || Astros || 0–2 || Pettitte || Wells || Dotel || 19,485 || 9–11
|- style="background:#cfc;"
| 21 || April 30 || @ Brewers || 4–2 || Benson || Sheets || Mesa || 17,533 || 10–11
|-

|- style="background:#cfc;"
| 22 || May 1 || @ Brewers || 8–7 (10) || Boyd || Vizcaino || Mesa || 25,134 || 11–11
|- style="background:#cfc;"
| 23 || May 2 || @ Brewers || 4–3 (11) || Meadows || Bennett || Mesa || 16,392 || 12–11
|- style="background:#fbb;"
| 24 || May 4 || @ Astros || 3–4 || Pettitte || Fogg || Lidge || 31,083 || 12–12
|- style="background:#fbb;"
| 25 || May 5 || @ Astros || 2–6 || Clemens || Wells || — || 35,883 || 12–13
|- style="background:#fbb;"
| 26 || May 6 || @ Astros || 2–5 || Miller || Benson || — || 36,055 || 12–14
|- style="background:#fbb;"
| 27 || May 7 || Dodgers || 0–4 || Alvarez || Perez || — || 20,944 || 12–15
|- style="background:#fbb;"
| 28 || May 8 || Dodgers || 3–4 || Mota || Torres || Gagne || 26,610 || 12–16
|- style="background:#fbb;"
| 29 || May 9 || Dodgers || 7–9 (14) || Falkenborg || Grabow || — || 16,554 || 12–17
|- style="background:#cfc;"
| 30 || May 11 || @ Rockies || 15–10 (12) || Torres || Lopez || — || 21,123 || 13–17
|- style="background:#fbb;"
| 31 || May 13 || @ Rockies || 5–7 || Estes || Benson || Chacon || — || 13–18
|- style="background:#cfc;"
| 32 || May 13 || @ Rockies || 11–2 || Perez || Jennings || — || 20,041 || 14–18
|- style="background:#cfc;"
| 33 || May 14 || @ Giants || 4–2 || Boehringer || Rodriguez || Mesa || 39,955 || 15–18
|- style="background:#cfc;"
| 34 || May 15 || @ Giants || 6–4 || Fogg || Tomko || Mesa || 41,042 || 16–18
|- style="background:#cfc;"
| 35 || May 16 || @ Giants || 8–1 || Wells || Williams || — || 40,705 || 17–18
|- style="background:#fbb;"
| 36 || May 19 || Padres || 3–6 || Lawrence || Johnston || Hoffman || — || 17–19
|- style="background:#fbb;"
| 37 || May 19 || Padres || 3–7 || Peavy || Perez || — || 13,366 || 17–20
|- style="background:#cfc;"
| 38 || May 20 || Padres || 9–7 || Gonzalez || Puffer || Mesa || 11,029 || 18–20
|- style="background:#cfc;"
| 39 || May 22 || Brewers || 3–1 || Fogg || Sheets || Mesa || 25,736 || 19–20
|- style="background:#fbb;"
| 40 || May 23 || Brewers || 1–2 || Vizcaino || Meadows || Kolb || 19,326 || 19–21
|- style="background:#cfc;"
| 41 || May 26 || @ Cardinals || 11–8 || Benson || Marquis || — || 29,526 || 20–21
|- style="background:#fbb;"
| 42 || May 27 || @ Cardinals || 3–6 || Suppan || Vogelsong || Isringhausen || 31,107 || 20–22
|- style="background:#cfc;"
| 43 || May 28 || Cubs || 9–5 || Torres || Borowski || — || — || 21–22
|- style="background:#cfc;"
| 44 || May 28 || Cubs || 5–4 (10) || Gonzalez || Beltran || — || 24,657 || 22–22
|- style="background:#cfc;"
| 45 || May 29 || Cubs || 10–7 || Fogg || Mitre || — || 37,806 || 23–22
|- style="background:#fbb;"
| 46 || May 30 || Cubs || 1–12 || Zambrano || Grabow || — || 30,392 || 23–23
|- style="background:#fbb;"
| 47 || May 31 || Cardinals || 3–8 || Marquis || Benson || — || 12,582 || 23–24
|-

|- style="background:#fbb;"
| 48 || June 1 || Cardinals || 1–8 || Suppan || Vogelsong || — || 11,540 || 23–25
|- style="background:#fbb;"
| 49 || June 2 || Cardinals || 3–5 || Carpenter || Johnston || Isringhausen || 12,100 || 23–26
|- style="background:#fbb;"
| 50 || June 3 || Cardinals || 2–4 || Williams || Perez || Isringhausen || 15,386 || 23–27
|- style="background:#cfc;"
| 51 || June 4 || @ Cubs || 2–1 || Torres || Borowski || Mesa || 40,024 || 24–27
|- style="background:#fbb;"
| 52 || June 5 || @ Cubs || 1–6 || Zambrano || Benson || — || 39,387 || 24–28
|- style="background:#fbb;"
| 53 || June 6 || @ Cubs || 1–4 || Maddux || Vogelsong || Hawkins || 39,016 || 24–29
|- style="background:#fbb;"
| 54 || June 7 || @ Rangers || 5–6 (10) || Cordero || Johnston || — || 25,286 || 24–30
|- style="background:#fbb;"
| 55 || June 10 || @ Rangers || 7–9 || Francisco || Meadows || Cordero || — || 24–31
|- style="background:#fbb;"
| 56 || June 10 || @ Rangers || 4–10 || Rogers || Fogg || — || 27,219 || 24–32
|- style="background:#fbb;"
| 57 || June 11 || @ Athletics || 1–6 || Hudson || Benson || — || 23,435 || 24–33
|- style="background:#fbb;"
| 58 || June 12 || @ Athletics || 11–12 || Rhodes || Corey || — || 24,606 || 24–34
|- style="background:#fbb;"
| 59 || June 13 || @ Athletics || 3–13 || Mulder || Wells || — || 34,328 || 24–35
|- style="background:#fbb;"
| 60 || June 15 || Angels || 2–4 || Shields || Torres || Rodriguez || 19,035 || 24–36
|- style="background:#cfc;"
| 61 || June 16 || Angels || 5–3 || Fogg || Lackey || Mesa || 22,404 || 25–36
|- style="background:#cfc;"
| 62 || June 17 || Angels || 5–2 || Benson || Colon || Mesa || 15,395 || 26–36
|- style="background:#fbb;"
| 63 || June 18 || Mariners || 4–5 || Moyer || Vogelsong || Guardado || 29,601 || 26–37
|- style="background:#fbb;"
| 64 || June 19 || Mariners || 1–5 || Piñeiro || Burnett || — || 24,341 || 26–38
|- style="background:#fbb;"
| 65 || June 20 || Mariners || 4–5 || Garcia || Perez || Guardado || 30,217 || 26–39
|- style="background:#fbb;"
| 66 || June 21 || @ Astros || 5–7 || Bullinger || Fogg || Dotel || 33,443 || 26–40
|- style="background:#fbb;"
| 67 || June 22 || @ Astros || 4–5 || Oswalt || Benson || Lidge || 31,819 || 26–41
|- style="background:#cfc;"
| 68 || June 23 || @ Astros || 7–2 || Vogelsong || Munro || — || 34,242 || 27–41
|- style="background:#fbb;"
| 69 || June 24 || @ Astros || 2–3 || Clemens || Burnett || Lidge || 39,851 || 27–42
|- style="background:#fbb;"
| 70 || June 25 || @ Reds || 4–6 || Acevedo || Torres || Graves || 41,959 || 27–43
|- style="background:#cfc;"
| 71 || June 26 || @ Reds || 1–0 || Corey || Jones || Mesa || 41,376 || 28–43
|- style="background:#cfc;"
| 72 || June 27 || @ Reds || 14–4 || Fogg || Wilson || — || 35,262 || 29–43
|- style="background:#cfc;"
| 73 || June 28 || Cardinals || 2–1 || Mesa || Tavarez || — || 15,544 || 30–43
|- style="background:#cfc;"
| 74 || June 29 || Cardinals || 3–0 || Burnett || Carpenter || Mesa || 18,152 || 31–43
|- style="background:#cfc;"
| 75 || June 30 || Cardinals || 6–5 || Mesa || Tavarez || — || 22,368 || 32–43
|-

|- style="background:#cfc;"
| 76 || July 2 || Brewers || 8–1 || Perez || Davis || — || — || 33–43
|- style="background:#cfc;"
| 77 || July 2 || Brewers || 13–2 || Fogg || Wise || — || 30,047 || 34–43
|- style="background:#cfc;"
| 78 || July 3 || Brewers || 5–3 || Benson || Obermueller || Mesa || 28,443 || 35–43
|- style="background:#cfc;"
| 79 || July 4 || Brewers || 6–2 || Burnett || Capuano || Mesa || 19,029 || 36–43
|- style="background:#cfc;"
| 80 || July 5 || @ Marlins || 3–1 || Wells || Beckett || Mesa || 13,224 || 37–43
|- style="background:#fbb;"
| 81 || July 6 || @ Marlins || 3–6 || Bump || Corey || Benitez || 12,330 || 37–44
|- style="background:#cfc;"
| 82 || July 7 || @ Marlins || 4–3 || Perez || Pavano || Mesa || 15,135 || 38–44
|- style="background:#fbb;"
| 83 || July 8 || @ Expos || 1–2 || Ayala || Grabow || Cordero || 7,746 || 38–45
|- style="background:#cfc;"
| 84 || July 9 || @ Expos || 11–0 || Burnett || Hill || — || 7,436 || 39–45
|- style="background:#fbb;"
| 85 || July 10 || @ Expos || 0–4 || Biddle || Wells || — || 8,780 || 39–46
|- style="background:#fbb;"
| 86 || July 11 || @ Expos || 1–2 || Downs || Fogg || Cordero || 8,101 || 39–47
|- style="background:#cfc;"
| 87 || July 16 || Marlins || 6–2 || Benson || Burnett || Mesa || 28,563 || 40–47
|- style="background:#cfc;"
| 88 || July 17 || Marlins || 4–2 || Torres || Benitez || Mesa || 26,729 || 41–47
|- style="background:#cfc;"
| 89 || July 18 || Marlins || 4–2 || Torres || Koch || Mesa || 18,048 || 42–47
|- style="background:#fbb;"
| 90 || July 19 || Expos || 2–6 || Horgan || Grabow || — || 14,787 || 42–48
|- style="background:#cfc;"
| 91 || July 20 || Expos || 2–1 || Burnett || Hernandez || Mesa || 18,075 || 43–48
|- style="background:#cfc;"
| 92 || July 21 || @ Braves || 4–3 || Benson || Byrd || Mesa || 30,131 || 44–48
|- style="background:#fbb;"
| 93 || July 22 || @ Braves || 1–2 (10) || Reitsma || Torres || — || 32,963 || 44–49
|- style="background:#cfc;"
| 94 || July 23 || Reds || 6–3 || Perez || Acevedo || Mesa || 37,703 || 45–49
|- style="background:#cfc;"
| 95 || July 24 || Reds || 14–4 || Grabow || Harang || — || 37,752 || 46–49
|- style="background:#cfc;"
| 96 || July 25 || Reds || 6–5 || Burnett || Van Poppel || Mesa || 24,962 || 47–49
|- style="background:#fbb;"
| 97 || July 26 || Braves || 2–4 || Wright || Benson || Smoltz || 19,164 || 47–50
|- style="background:#cfc;"
| 98 || July 27 || Braves || 8–4 || Gonzalez || Gryboski || — || 15,946 || 48–50
|- style="background:#fbb;"
| 99 || July 28 || Braves || 0–1 || Ortiz || Perez || Smoltz || 22,977 || 48–51
|- style="background:#fbb;"
| 100 || July 29 || Braves || 2–3 || Cruz || Mesa || Smoltz || 25,988 || 48–52
|- style="background:#fbb;"
| 101 || July 30 || @ Brewers || 0–5 || Davis || Burnett || — || 34,702 || 48–53
|- style="background:#cfc;"
| 102 || July 31 || @ Brewers || 4–1 || Vogelsong || Santos || Mesa || 35,152 || 49–53
|-

|- style="background:#fbb;"
| 103 || August 1 || @ Brewers || 7–8 || Vizcaino || Meadows || — || 25,047 || 49–54
|- style="background:#fbb;"
| 104 || August 3 || @ Dodgers || 2–3 || Penny || Perez || Gagne || 34,581 || 49–55
|- style="background:#fbb;"
| 105 || August 4 || @ Dodgers || 1–2 || Lima || Fogg || Gagne || 34,792 || 49–56
|- style="background:#fbb;"
| 106 || August 5 || @ Dodgers || 3–8 || Weaver || Burnett || — || 38,852 || 49–57
|- style="background:#fbb;"
| 107 || August 6 || @ Padres || 1–13 || Peavy || Vogelsong || — || 40,026 || 49–58
|- style="background:#cfc;"
| 108 || August 7 || @ Padres || 3–1 || Wells || Wells || Mesa || 40,681 || 50–58
|- style="background:#cfc;"
| 109 || August 8 || @ Padres || 4–2 || Perez || Lawrence || Mesa || 39,742 || 51–58
|- style="background:#cfc;"
| 110 || August 10 || Giants || 8–7 || Mesa || Herges || — || 24,930 || 52–58
|- style="background:#cfc;"
| 111 || August 11 || Giants || 8–6 (11) || Grabow || Hermanson || — || 25,814 || 53–58
|- style="background:#fbb;"
| 112 || August 12 || Giants || 0–7 || Schmidt || Vogelsong || — || 24,446 || 53–59
|- style="background:#fbb;"
| 113 || August 13 || Rockies || 3–9 || Fassero || Wells || — || 27,522 || 53–60
|- style="background:#cfc;"
| 114 || August 14 || Rockies || 6–1 || Perez || Wright || — || 37,312 || 54–60
|- style="background:#cfc;"
| 115 || August 15 || Rockies || 3–0 || Fogg || Kennedy || Mesa || 24,862 || 55–60
|- style="background:#cfc;"
| 116 || August 16 || @ Diamondbacks || 8–7 (10) || Mesa || Aquino || Gonzalez || 28,768 || 56–60
|- style="background:#cfc;"
| 117 || August 17 || @ Diamondbacks || 7–1 || Vogelsong || Randolph || — || 30,030 || 57–60
|- style="background:#fbb;"
| 118 || August 18 || @ Diamondbacks || 3–6 || Fossum || Van Benschoten || Aquino || 28,066 || 57–61
|- style="background:#cfc;"
| 119 || August 19 || @ Cardinals || 3–2 (10) || Mesa || Kline || Grabow || 33,854 || 58–61
|- style="background:#fbb;"
| 120 || August 20 || @ Cardinals || 4–5 || Haren || Fogg || Isringhausen || 32,062 || 58–62
|- style="background:#fbb;"
| 121 || August 20 || @ Cardinals || 3–5 || Carpenter || Gonzalez || Isringhausen || 38,640 || 58–63
|- style="background:#fbb;"
| 122 || August 21 || @ Cardinals || 6–10 || Suppan || Burnett || — || 46,017 || 58–64
|- style="background:#fbb;"
| 123 || August 22 || @ Cardinals || 4–11 || Morris || Vogelsong || Kline || 35,345 || 58–65
|- style="background:#fbb;"
| 124 || August 23 || Diamondbacks || 4–5 || Nance || Grabow || Aquino || 25,154 || 58–66
|- style="background:#cfc;"
| 125 || August 24 || Diamondbacks || 3–1 || Perez || Gonzalez || Mesa || 16,332 || 59–66
|- style="background:#cfc;"
| 126 || August 25 || Diamondbacks || 2–1 || Fogg || Johnson || Mesa || 24,853 || 60–66
|- style="background:#fbb;"
| 127 || August 27 || Cardinals || 5–8 || Suppan || Vogelsong || Isringhausen || 27,475 || 60–67
|- style="background:#fbb;"
| 128 || August 28 || Cardinals || 4–6 || Morris || Figueroa || Isringhausen || 19,167 || 60–68
|- style="background:#fbb;"
| 129 || August 29 || Cardinals || 0–4 || Marquis || Perez || Tavarez || 25,005 || 60–69
|- style="background:#cfc;"
| 130 || August 30 || @ Brewers || 5–1 || Fogg || Hendrickson || — || 23,512 || 61–69
|- style="background:#fbb;"
| 131 || August 31 || @ Brewers || 2–4 || Wise || Van Benschoten || Kolb || 13,704 || 61–70
|-

|- style="background:#cfc;"
| 132 || September 1 || @ Brewers || 5–2 (10) || Torres || Bennett || Mesa || 15,625 || 62–70
|- style="background:#fbb;"
| 133 || September 2 || @ Brewers || 1–7 || Sheets || Williams || — || 11,763 || 62–71
|- style="background:#fbb;"
| 134 || September 3 || @ Astros || 6–8 || Clemens || Perez || Lidge || 40,992 || 62–72
|- style="background:#fbb;"
| 135 || September 4 || @ Astros || 5–6 || Qualls || Figueroa || Lidge || 38,605 || 62–73
|- style="background:#fbb;"
| 136 || September 5 || @ Astros || 5–10 || Munro || Van Benschoten || — || 40,569 || 62–74
|- style="background:#fbb;"
| 137 || September 6 || Brewers || 5–9 || Glover || Vogelsong || Kolb || 12,771 || 62–75
|- style="background:#cfc;"
| 138 || September 7 || Brewers || 2–0 || Williams || Sheets || Mesa || 20,563 || 63–75
|- style="background:#cfc;"
| 139 || September 9 || Astros || 3–1 || Perez || Hernandez || Mesa || — || 64–75
|- style="background:#fbb;"
| 140 || September 9 || Astros || 2–9 || Gallo || Fogg || — || 10,495 || 64–76
|- style="background:#cfc;"
| 141 || September 10 || Astros || 6–1 || Van Benschoten || Munro || — || 26,097 || 65–76
|- style="background:#cfc;"
| 142 || September 11 || Astros || 5–2 || Vogelsong || Backe || Mesa || 14,877 || 66–76
|- style="background:#fbb;"
| 143 || September 12 || Astros || 4–5 (10) || Lidge || Mesa || Qualls || 11,521 || 66–77
|- style="background:#fbb;"
| 144 || September 13 || @ Cubs || 2–7 || Maddux || Brooks || — || 38,326 || 66–78
|- style="background:#fbb;"
| 145 || September 14 || @ Cubs || 2–3 (12) || Wellemeyer || Meadows || — || 38,676 || 66–79
|- style="background:#fbb;"
| 146 || September 15 || @ Cubs || 5–13 || Wuertz || Perez || Dempster || 38,395 || 66–80
|- style="background:#fbb;"
| 147 || September 18 || Mets || 7–8 (10) || Yates || Torres || Looper || 19,236 || 66–81
|- style="background:#cfc;"
| 148 || September 19 || Mets || 1–0 || Vogelsong || Heilman || Mesa || — || 67–81
|- style="background:#cfc;"
| 149 || September 19 || Mets || 6–1 || Williams || Benson || — || 18,219 || 68–81
|- style="background:#fbb;"
| 150 || September 21 || Cubs || 4–5 (10) || Hawkins || Torres || Dempster || 12,701 || 68–82
|- style="background:#fbb;"
| 151 || September 22 || Cubs || 0–1 || Zambrano || Perez || Remlinger || 22,257 || 68–83
|- style="background:#fbb;"
| 152 || September 23 || Cubs || 3–6 || Maddux || Figueroa || Hawkins || 13,298 || 68–84
|- style="background:#fbb;"
| 153 || September 24 || Reds || 8–14 || Harang || Vogelsong || — || 29,066 || 68–85
|- style="background:#fbb;"
| 154 || September 25 || Reds || 4–7 || Wilson || Williams || Valentine || 26,500 || 68–86
|- style="background:#cfc;"
| 155 || September 26 || Reds || 4–2 || Fogg || Acevedo || Mesa || 23,841 || 69–86
|- style="background:#cfc;"
| 156 || September 27 || @ Phillies || 6–1 || Perez || Milton || — || 30,268 || 70–86
|- style="background:#fbb;"
| 157 || September 29 || @ Phillies || 4–8 || Padilla || Snell || — || — || 70–87
|- style="background:#fbb;"
| 158 || September 29 || @ Phillies || 3–8 || Myers || Torres || — || 33,127 || 70–88
|-

|- style="background:#fbb;"
| 159 || October 1 || @ Reds || 1–5 || Wilson || Williams || — || 26,841 || 70–89
|- style="background:#cfc;"
| 160 || October 2 || @ Reds || 3–1 || Fogg || Van Poppel || Mesa || 26,128 || 71–89
|- style="background:#cfc;"
| 161 || October 3 || @ Reds || 2–0 || Perez || Claussen || Mesa || 30,854 || 72–89
|-

|-
| Legend:       = Win       = LossBold = Pirates team member

Record vs. opponents

Detailed records

Roster

Opening Day lineup

Awards and honors

Jason Bay, NL Rookie of the Year

2004 Major League Baseball All-Star Game
Jack Wilson, SS, reserve

Statistics
Hitting
Note: G = Games played; AB = At bats; H = Hits; Avg. = Batting average; HR = Home runs; RBI = Runs batted in

Pitching
Note: G = Games pitched; IP = Innings pitched; W = Wins; L = Losses; ERA = Earned run average; SO = Strikeouts

Transactions
May 21, 2004: Raúl Mondesí was released by the Pittsburgh Pirates.
June 29, 2004: Scott Sheldon was signed as a free agent with the Pittsburgh Pirates.
July 30, 2004: Kris Benson was traded by the Pittsburgh Pirates with Jeff Keppinger to the New York Mets for José Bautista, Ty Wigginton, and Matt Peterson (minors).
August 4, 2004: Chris Stynes was released by the Pittsburgh Pirates.
August 18, 2004: Randall Simon was released by the Pittsburgh Pirates.

Draft picks

Note
Age at time of draft.

Farm system

LEAGUE CHAMPIONS: Hickory

References

 2004 Pittsburgh Pirates at Baseball Reference
 2004 Pittsburgh Pirates  at Baseball Almanac

Pittsburgh Pirates seasons
Pittsburgh Pirates Season, 2004
Pittsburgh Pirates Season, 2004
Pittsburgh Pirates